DXRR (101.1 FM), formerly known as MOR 101.1, was a radio station owned and operated by ABS-CBN Corporation. The station's studios and transmitter were located at the ABS-CBN Broadcast Center, Shrine Hills, Matina, Davao City.

History

The station was inaugurated on January 25, 1992, as a relay station of over Radio Romance in Manila. On February 16, 1995, the station was launched as Star Radio 101.1 with a mass-based format. In 1997, following the formation of the Regional Network Group (RNG), it was rebranded as ABS-CBN Radio 101.1. On July 14, 2001, as part of rebranding ABS-CBN's RNG FM stations coinciding with the Cagayan de Oro station's 8th Anniversary, the station rebranded as MOR 101.1 For Life!. Since then, it became among the top radio station in the city.

On May 5, 2020, the station, along with the other My Only Radio stations, went off the air due to the cease and desist order of the National Telecommunications Commission following the ABS-CBN franchise renewal controversy. It currently operates as an online platform.

References

External links

Radio stations in Davao City
Radio stations established in 1992
MOR Philippines stations
Radio stations disestablished in 2020
Defunct radio stations in the Philippines